Football competitions at the 2022 South American Games in Asuncion, Paraguay were held between 4 and 12 October 2022 at the Complejo de Fútbol located within the Parque Olímpico cluster in Luque, a sub-venue apart from Asunción.

Two medal events were scheduled to be contested: a men's and women's tournament. A total of 252 athletes (144 athletes–8 teams for men and 108 athletes–6 teams for women) competed in the events. Both tournaments had age limits, the men's tournament was restricted to under-19 players (born on or after 1 January 2003) while women's tournament was restricted to under-20 players (born on or after 1 January 2002).

Chile and Paraguay were the defending champions of the South American Games men's and women's football events. Both teams won their respective title in the South American Games' previous edition.

Paraguay and Venezuela won the gold medal in the men's and women's events respectively.

Participating nations
A total of 8 ODESUR nations registered teams for the football events. Each nation was able to enter a maximum of 36 athletes (one team of 18 players per gender). Ecuador and Peru competed in the men's event while the other six nations competed in both events.

Medal summary

Medal table

Medalists

Men's tournament

Group stage

Group A

Group B

Final stage

Final standings

Women's tournament

Group stage

Group A

Group B

Final stage

Final standings

References

External links
 ASU2022 Soccer at ASU2022 official website.
 ASU2022 Soccer Teams Male.
 ASU2022 Soccer Teams Female.

Football
South American Games
2022